Burdon is a village and civil parish in the City of Sunderland in Tyne and Wear, England.

Burdon may also refer to:

 Burdon (surname), including a list of people with the name
 Burdon Canal Nature Reserve, in Belize District, Belize
 Great Burdon, a village in Darlington, County Durham, England
 Old Burdon, a village in County Durham, England